Kathleen Lowe Melde is a Professor and Associate Dean in Electrical Engineering at the University of Arizona in Tucson. She was named a Fellow of the Institute of Electrical and Electronics Engineers (IEEE) in 2012 for her contributions to tunable antennae and their integration in electrical packaging.

Melde received a B.S. from California State University, Long Beach in 1985, an M.S. from California State University, Northridge in 1987, and a Ph.D. from the University of California, Los Angeles in 1996, all in electrical engineering.

References 

Fellow Members of the IEEE
Living people
California State University, Long Beach alumni
UCLA Henry Samueli School of Engineering and Applied Science alumni
California State University, Northridge alumni
Engineers from California
Year of birth missing (living people)
Place of birth missing (living people)
American electrical engineers